Shewa is a village and Union Council of Swabi District in the Khyber Pakhtunkhwa of Pakistan. It is located at 34°14'0N 72°21'0E with an altitude of 340 metres (1118).

Shewa is the largest old and historic village in Swabi District with a total population of over 40,000. It is located 5km north of Mardan Swabi Road. Most people are farmers.

Tobacco, maize and wheat are major crops, and potatoes and peas are also grown. The oranges of Shewa village are noted for their delicious taste. Tobacco is popular all over Pakistan. Tobacco business is common. There is a lot of animal husbandry. Cows and buffaloes are bred with passion. Sheep and goats are also present in large numbers. Livestock trade is also common.

Agriculture mostly uses tube wells. Canal water is also available in some areas. In addition to traditional farming methods, modern equipment is also used.

The people of Shewa are hard and hardworking. Shewa's hospitality is very popular. There are more educated people here but most of them are unemployed.  Despite this, Shewa's educated people occupy high positions, doctors, engineers and other specialists are born here, who have achieved success in their respective fields and even today many educated young people are government employees. Today, the youth of Shewa village work in departments like the army, railways, agriculture, health, education, but the number of employees in the education sector is high.

There has been a traditional Jargha in Shewa village since ancient times, who tries to solve the problems of the village and provides land free of cost for all government buildings. The jirga is responsible for overseeing common assets.

Shewa Educated Social Workers Association (SESWA) is playing a role in the development of the village. The organization is working in every field of development and it has achieved success; all the streets of the village have been paved, in which the role of this organization was prominent.
At the government level, there is one degree-granting college, two high schools, two middle schools and more than two dozen primary schools. Private schools also exist. In the health sector, there is an RHC hospital and a dispensary, as well as a private clinic.

The beautiful bazaar in Shewa is a commercial center where all kinds of needs are met. People from the surrounding areas go there. Shewa also has poultry farms and meat sellers. There are also bakeries of sweets, which are very popular, people of Shewa eat chapli kebab with great enthusiasm. The tradition sandals made of special leather, were very beautiful, but are no longer the norm.

Shewa is a beautiful village surrounded by mountains, rivers and lush fields. The most famous mountain range of Karamar also belongs to the village of Shewa.
Shewa is a centrally located commercial hub of Tehsil Razar. It also has commercial dairy farms. 
 
The traditional game of Mokha and Kabaddi was played with great interest in sports but nowadays interest in it has diminished. Today's youth play cricket, volleyball and other sports with enthusiasm. Cobblers and tailors are here. Even at home, women make their own traditional clothes. From which they get a fair profit, motorcycle mechanics are also here and bull races are held on a regular basis.

Geography
The town is situated at the site of the old Hindu temple of the Hindu god Shiva, hence the name Shewa.
But shewa also a declared union council of Swabi district.

[ Union Council ] Swabi Khyber Pakhtunkhwa Pakistan 

Populated places in Swabi District
Swabi District